The 46th Filmfare Awards were held on 17 February 2001, to honor the best films of 2000.

Mohabbatein led the ceremony with 12 nominations, followed by Kaho Naa... Pyaar Hai with 11 nominations.

Kaho Naa... Pyaar Hai won 9 awards, including Best Film, Best Director (for Rakesh Roshan), Best Actor and Best Male Debut (both for Hrithik Roshan), thus becoming the most-awarded film at the ceremony.

Hrithik Roshan received dual nominations for Best Actor for his performances in Fiza and Kaho Naa... Pyaar Hai, winning for the latter.

Real-life couple Amitabh Bachchan and Jaya Bachchan were both nominated, and eventually won Best Supporting Actor and Best Supporting Actress respectively, for their performances in Mohabbatein and Fiza.

Main Awards

Best Film
 Kaho Naa... Pyaar Hai 
Dhadkan
Josh
Mission Kashmir
Mohabbatein

Best Director
 Rakesh Roshan – Kaho Naa... Pyaar Hai 
Aditya Chopra – Mohabbatein
Dharmesh Darshan – Dhadkan
Mansoor Khan – Josh
Vidhu Vinod Chopra – Mission Kashmir

Best Actor
 Hrithik Roshan – Kaho Naa... Pyaar Hai 
Anil Kapoor – Pukar
Hrithik Roshan – Fiza
Sanjay Dutt – Mission Kashmir
Shah Rukh Khan – Mohabbatein

Best Actress
 Karisma Kapoor – Fiza 
Aishwarya Rai – Hamara Dil Aapke Paas Hai
Madhuri Dixit – Pukar
Preity Zinta – Kya Kehna!
Tabu – Astitva

Best Supporting Actor
 Amitabh Bachchan – Mohabbatein 
Atul Kulkarni – Hey Ram
Chandrachur Singh – Kya Kehna!
Sayaji Shinde – Kurukshetra
Suniel Shetty – Refugee

Best Supporting Actress 
 Jaya Bachchan – Fiza 
Aishwarya Rai – Mohabbatein
Mahima Chaudhry – Dhadkan
Rani Mukerji – Har Dil Jo Pyar Karega
Sonali Kulkarni – Mission Kashmir

Best Comedian
 Paresh Rawal – Hera Pheri 
Anupam Kher – Dulhan Hum Le Jayenge
Govinda – Kunwara
Johnny Lever – Kunwara
Johnny Lever – Phir Bhi Dil Hai Hindustani

Best Villain 
 Suniel Shetty – Dhadkan 
Govinda – Shikari
Jackie Shroff – Mission Kashmir
Rahul Dev – Champion
Sharad Kapoor – Josh

Best Debut, Male
 Hrithik Roshan – Kaho Naa... Pyaar Hai 
 Abhishek Bachchan – Refugee

Best Debut, Female
 Kareena Kapoor – Refugee

Best Music Director 
 Kaho Naa... Pyaar Hai – Rajesh Roshan 
Dhadkan – Nadeem-Shravan
Fiza – Anu Malik
Josh – Anu Malik
Mohabbatein – Jatin–Lalit

Best Lyricist
 Refugee – Javed Akhtar for Panchi Nadiya
Dhadkan – Sameer for Tum Dil Ki Dhadkan Main
Fiza – Gulzar for Aaja Mahiya
Kaho Naa... Pyaar Hai – Ibrahim Ashk for Na Tum Jaano Na Hum
Mohabbatein – Anand Bakshi for Humko Humise Churaalo

Best Playback Singer, Male
 Kaho Naa... Pyaar Hai – Lucky Ali for Na Tum Jaano Na Hum 
Dhadkan – Udit Narayan for Dil Ne Yeh Kaha Hai Dil Se
Fiza – Sonu Nigam for Tu Hawa Hai
Kaho Naa... Pyaar Hai – Lucky Ali for Ek Pal Ka Jeena
Mohabbatein – Udit Narayan for Humko Humise Churaalo
Refugee – Sonu Nigam for Panchi Nadiya

Best Playback Singer, Female
 Dhadkan – Alka Yagnik for Dil Ne Yeh Kaha Hai Dil Se 
Fiza – Sunidhi Chauhan for Mehboob Mere
Har Dil Jo Pyar Karega – Preeti & Pinky for Piya Piya
Josh – Alka Yagnik for Haye Mera Dil
Kaho Naa... Pyaar Hai – Alka Yagnik for Kaho Naa... Pyaar Hai
Refugee – Alka Yagnik for Panchi Nadiya

Best Story
Kya Kehna! – Honey Irani

Best Screenplay
Kaho Naa... Pyaar Hai – Ravi Kapoor and Honey Irani

Best Dialogue
Refugee – J. P. Dutta

Best Background Score
Jungle – Sandeep Chowta

Best Action
Mission Kashmir – Allan Amin

Best Cinematography
Refugee – Basheer Ali

Best Editing
Kaho Naa... Pyaar Hai – Sanjay Verma

Best Choreography
Kaho Naa... Pyaar Hai – Farah Khan for Ek Pal Ka Jeena

Best Sound
Mohabbatein – Anuj Mathur

Lifetime Achievement Award
Feroz Khan and Asha Bhosle

R. D. Burman Award
Sunidhi Chauhan

Special Jury Award
Anu Malik – Refugee

Critics' Awards

Best Film
Halo

Best Actor
Shah Rukh Khan – Mohabbatein

Best Actress
Tabu – Astitva

See also
 47th Filmfare Awards
 49th Filmfare Awards

References

 
 https://www.imdb.com/event/ev0000245/2001/

External links
 

Filmfare Awards
Filmfare